Żarki Wielkie  is a village in the administrative district of Gmina Trzebiel, within Żary County, Lubusz Voivodeship, in western Poland, close to the German border.

Notable residents
Eduard Clemens Fechner (1799-1861), German artist
Gustav Fechner (1801-1887), German philosopher

References

Villages in Żary County